Michelle Wai (born on November 24, 1984) is a Hong Kong actress. She was a part-time model before entering the entertainment industry. Now she is an actress under the Emperor Motion Pictures label. She is 162 cm tall.

Filmography

Film

Television

Drama

Trivia
Before starting her acting career, she worked in the jewellery business armed with a GIA appraiser certification, where she specialised in diamond trade and jewellery design. Michelle holds a wide spectrum of licenses from operating local vessel, lifeguard and to diving.

References

External links

Michelle Wai's Official Website
Michelle Wai's Yahoo Blog

1984 births
Living people
Hong Kong people
21st-century Hong Kong actresses